Rolf-Dieter Amend (21 March 1949 – 4 January 2022) was a German slalom canoeist who competed in the 1970s. He won a gold medal in the C-2 event at the 1972 Summer Olympics in Munich.

Amend was born in Magdeburg. He won three medals at the ICF Canoe Slalom World Championships with two golds (C-2 team: 1971, 1975) and a silver (C-2: 1971). He died on 4 January 2022, at the age of 72.

References

External links
 
 

1949 births
2022 deaths
Sportspeople from Magdeburg
German male canoeists
Sportspeople from Saxony-Anhalt
Olympic canoeists of East Germany
Canoeists at the 1972 Summer Olympics
Olympic gold medalists for East Germany
Olympic medalists in canoeing
Medalists at the 1972 Summer Olympics
Medalists at the ICF Canoe Slalom World Championships
Recipients of the Patriotic Order of Merit in silver